Phil Griffiths (born 18 March 1949) is an English former racing cyclist from  Stone, Staffordshire.

Cycling career
He rode for Great Britain in the Olympic Games, and represented England winning a silver medal in the road race, at the 1974 British Commonwealth Games in Christchurch, New Zealand. Four years later he represented England in the road race and individual pursuit, at the 1978 Commonwealth Games in Edmonton, Alberta, Canada.

He is one of the few British riders to have held the yellow jersey in the Peace Race.

Cycling management

Palmarès 
1971
 1st British Best All-Rounder
 3rd Tour of the Cotswolds
1972
  2nd British National Road Race Championships (Amateur)
1973
 3rd Archer Grand Prix
 1st Overall, Premier Calendar
 30th Overall, Peace Race
 3rd stage 2, Peace Race
 6th stage 4, Peace Race
 on stage 4
1974
  Commonwealth Games, Road Race
 3rd Overall, Premier Calendar
 2nd Tour of the Cotswolds
 1st British Best All-Rounder
1975
  2nd British National Road Race Championships (Amateur)
 1st Overall, Premier Calendar
 1st British Best All-Rounder
1976
 DNF Olympic Games, Road race
 6th Olympic Games, Team Time Trial (100km)
 1st British Best All-Rounder
  3rd British National Road Race Championships (Amateur)
1977
 3rd Lincoln GP
1978
 29th Commonwealth Games, Road Race
 QF Commonwealth Games, 4000m Individual pursuit, Track
 1st Archer Grand Prix
 1st stage 4, Girvan
 1st prologue, Milk Race
1979
 14th GP des Nations
 1st British Best All-Rounder

References

External links 

 

1949 births
Living people
English male cyclists
Olympic cyclists of Great Britain
Cyclists at the 1976 Summer Olympics
Cyclists at the 1978 Commonwealth Games
Directeur sportifs
People from Stone, Staffordshire
Commonwealth Games silver medallists for England
Commonwealth Games medallists in cycling
Medallists at the 1974 British Commonwealth Games